Scott Krug (born September 16, 1975) is a Wisconsin politician and legislator.

He graduated from the University of Wisconsin–Green Bay with a degree in psychology in 2009. He was elected to the Wisconsin State Assembly in 2010.

Krug is the Chairperson of the Assembly Public Benefit Reform Committee, the vice chair of the Forestry, Parks and Outdoor Recreation Committee and serves on the Criminal Justice, Environment, Government Accountability and Reform and Colleges and Universities Committees.

In 2010 Krug was elected to his first term defeating the longest serving Assembly member in Wisconsin history.

References

University of Wisconsin–Green Bay alumni
Republican Party members of the Wisconsin State Assembly
1975 births
Living people
People from Wisconsin Rapids, Wisconsin
21st-century American politicians